Alarm may refer to:

Alerts and warnings
Alarm clock, a clock that wakes people
Alarm device, a device that gives an audible or visual warning of a problem or condition
Alarm signal, a warning signal used by humans and other animals

Arts, entertainment, and media

Films
 The Alarm (film), a 1914 American film
 Alarm (1938 film), a Danish film
 Alarm (1941 film), a German film
 Alarm (2008 film), an Irish film

Music
 The Alarm, a Welsh alternative rock band, who were most popular in the 1980s
 The Alarm (EP), a 1983 rock album
 "Alarm" (Anne-Marie song), 2016
 "Alarm" (Namie Amuro song), 2004

Other uses in arts, entertainment, and media
 The Alarm (Boyle), a bronze statue
 The Alarm (newspaper), an anarchist newspaper published in Chicago in the 1880s

Other uses
 Alarm.com, a home and business security technology company
ALARM, a British anti-radiation missile designed to destroy enemy radars
Alarm (gamer)

See also
 Multiple-alarm fire
 Precautionary statement or warning
 The Alarmist, a 1997 film